The Malvan is a small river that flows through the Alpes-Maritimes department of southeastern France. Its source is in Vence, and it flows into the Cagne in Cagnes-sur-Mer.

References

Rivers of France
Rivers of Alpes-Maritimes
Rivers of Provence-Alpes-Côte d'Azur